Bele Bachem (née Renate Gabriele Bachem) (17 May 1916 – 5 June 2005) was a German graphic artist, book illustrator, stage designer and writer. In 1997, Bachem was awarded the Order of Merit of the Federal Republic of Germany.

Life and work 

Bele Bachem was the daughter of the painter Gottfried Maria Bachem and his wife Hedwig. She was born, and spent her childhood, in Düsseldorf. She went to Berlin University of the Arts at the end of the 1920s, where she was taught by Ludwig Bartning and Max Kraus. Her work quickly attracted attention and she was able to pursue her own style undisturbed. Soon she received her first assignments and was finally taken to Munich by Otto Falckenberg to create stage sets at the theater. In 1940 she married the art historian Günther Böhmer, (died 1992), and later that year their daughter was born. Shortly thereafter, their work was denounced by the National Socialists, and, within a year, public exhibitions of her work were banned.

After the war, Bachem published drawings in the satirical magazine Der Simpl and eventually resumed working on stage designs for the theatre. She illustrated and wrote books and designed for films. From 1954 to 1956 she was a lecturer in the Department of Illustration at the Werkkunstschule in Offenbach am Main. Bachem supplied numerous designs for the porcelain manufacturer Rosenthal and for the wallpaper factory Brascha Rasch.

Bachem is regarded as one of the most important German post-war artists and is, besides Unica Zürn, one of the few surrealists of German literature illustration.

Book illustrations 
 Clemens Brentano: Gockel, Hinkel und Gackeleia. Mit farbigen Illustrationen von Bele Bachem. Hamburg, Ellermann, 1952.
 Peter Scher: Drollige Käuze. Mit 20 Zeichnungen von Bele Bachem. (= Deutsche Soldatenbücherei Band 12), Siegismund, Berlin 1940.
 Catull: Liebesgedichte. Lateinisch und Deutsch, neu übertragen von Carl Fischer. Mit 48 Zeichnungen von Bele Bachem. Emil Vollmer Verlag, Wiesbaden o.J.
 Altchinesische Liebesgeschichten. Ins Deutsche übertragen von Franz Kuhn. Mit 28 Illustrationen von Bele Bachem. Emil Vollmer Verlag, Wiesbaden o.J.
 Lukian: Hetärengespräche. Übertragen von Carl Fischer. Mit 33 Zeichnungen von Bele Bachem. Emil Vollmer Verlag, Wiesbaden o.J.
 Ernst R. Lehmann-Leander (Hrsg.): Der Gürtel der Aphrodite. 100 erotische Gedichte aus 1000 Jahren antiker Kultur. Mit 26 Zeichnungen von Bele Bachem. Emil Vollmer Verlag, Wiesbaden o.J.
 Bodo Brodt: Parlez-moi d'amour ! Kleine Biographie des Schlagers. Mit Illustrationen von Bele Bachem. Offenbach/Main 1956.
 Stefan Békeffy: Der Hund, der Herr Bozzi hieß. Schutzumschlag, Einbandzeichnung und Illustrationen von Bele Bachem. Berlin 1959.
 Hansjürgen Weidlich: Liebesgeschichten für Schüchterne. 17 Illustrationen (einschl. Umschlag), Agentur des Rauhen Hauses, Hamburg 1959.
 Günther Schwenn: Zwischen sämtlichen Musen. Espresso-Elegien. Peters-Verlag, Berlin 1964.
 Vom Sklaven der Liebe. Die schönsten erotischen Geschichten aus 1001 Nacht. Nymphenburger Verlagsanstalt, München 1980.

Published works 
 Bele Bachem: Rosenwasser ausverkauft. Düsseldorf 1977.
 Bele Bachem: Signatur Objekt Nr. 2: Dein Gestern – Dein Schatten. Rolandseck 1985.
 Bele Bachem: Eine übliche kleine Bosheit. Düsseldorf 1980.

Awards 
 1952: Poster Prize "Toulouse-Lautrec" of the City of Paris
 1955: Poster Prize of the City of Vienna
 1959: Prize of the Staatlichen Graphischen Sammlung München
 1962: Schwabinger Art Prize
1966: "Water Lily Prize" of the City of Munich
 1968: "Premier prix international IIIé salon de femme", Cannes
 1986: Medal "München leuchtet – The friends of Munich"
 1997: Order of Merit of the Federal Republic of Germany

Art exhibitions 
 2015. Munich artist's house. Bele Bachem: "The longer you live, the more you become an apprentice."
 2016. Bele Bachem (1916-2005) on the occasion of her 100th birthday. Gallery in the Schlosspavillon Ismaning
 1998. Gemeinschaftsausstellung "Der Faden der Ariadne" im Herrenhof, Mußlach
 1997. Kulturgebäude Aschheim - Galerie Bollhagen, Worpswede
 1996 Galerie Hartmann, München Galerie Villa Rolandseck, Remagen Galerie der BBV, München
 1995. Galerie Markt Bruckmühl
1994. Galerie Rutzmoser, München Hartgalerie, Germering Fischerplatz-Galerie, Ulm
 1993. Osram-Haus, München
 1992. Neue Münchener Galerie, München
 1991. Galerie Schaffhaus, Neu-Ulm Galerie am Stephansberg, Bamberg
 1988. Fischerplatz-Galerie, Ulm Galerie Kugel, Moers
 1987. Galerie Götz, Stuttgart
 1986. Galerie Wolfgang Ketterer, München
 1985. Städtische Galerie, Rosenheim Edwin-Scharff-Haus, Neu-Ulm
1984. Galerie Bollhagen, Worpswede
 1983. Bodley Gallery, New York
 1982. BMW- Haus, München Galerie Turkuwaz, Ankara
 1980. Bayerischer Pavillon, Bonn Internationale Kunstmesse Basel
 1979. Galerie Lutzke, Wachtberg Galerie Harms, Mannheim Galerie im Falckenhof, Rheine
 1978. Galerie Zwei müller, Baden bei Wien
 1977. Komunale Galerie, Berlin Galerie Harms, Mannheim Galerie Europa, Berlin Galerie Brettschneider, Berlin Galerie Kamp, Amsterdam
 1976. Galerie an der Düssel, Düsseldorf Galerie Harms, Mannheim Galerie AAA, Ascona
 1973. Galerie Rutzmoser, München
 1972. Galerie Hiepe, München
 1971. Galerie Hell, Saarbrücken Galerie am Stephansberg, Bamberg Galerie Mensch, Hamburg Galerie Samuel Show, New York
 1970. Galerie Ostheimer, Frankfurt a. M. Galerie am Abend, München Galerie Hartmann, München
 1969. Galerie Griebert, Montreux Galerie Peithner- Lichtenfels, Wien
 1968. Galerie Lempertz, 1. Retrospektive, Köln
 1967. Galerie Voigt, Nürmberg
1966. Galerie von Sydow, Frankfurt a. M.
 1965. Galerie Totti, Mailand Galerie von der Höh, Hamburg
 1964. Galerie Moering, Wiesbaden
 1963. Galerie Gurlitt, München
 1957. Biennale Santa Margaretha
 1954. Biennale Bozen
 1952. Galerie Sello, Hamburg
 1951. Münchner Pavillon, München
 1947. Galerie Kikio Haller, Zürich

Literature 
 Ulrike Camilla Gärtner: Bele Bachem. Werkverzeichnis 1935–1986. München 1986.
 Olaf N. Schwanke: Ich neige so zum Düsteren. Ein längst fälliger Essay zu Deutschlands wahrscheinlich einziger literarischer Surrealistin: Bele Bachem. (PDF; 79 kB), In: Kritische Ausgabe, 1/2002, S. 38–42.
 Theo Rommerskirchen: Bele Bachem. In: viva signatur si! Remagen-Rolandseck 2005.

References

External links 
 
 Bele Bachem in HeidICON -  Illustrations in Der Simpl
 Bele Bachem 100.

German scenic designers
1916 births
2005 deaths
20th-century German painters
German illustrators
German women painters
Modern painters
Recipients of the Cross of the Order of Merit of the Federal Republic of Germany
20th-century German women artists